Babelomurex glaber is a species of sea snail, a marine gastropod mollusc in the family Muricidae, the murex snails or rock snails.

Description

Distribution
This marine species occurs off New Caledonia.

References

 Kosuge, S., 1999. Report on the family Coralliophilidae in the collection of the Natal Museum (republic of South Africa) with a description of new species (Gastropoda). Bulletin of the Institute of Malacology of Tokyo 3(6)("1998"): 83–84
 Oliverio, M. (2008). Coralliophilinae (Neogastropoda: Muricidae) from the southwest Pacific. in: Héros, V. et al. (Ed.) Tropical Deep-Sea Benthos 25. Mémoires du Muséum national d'Histoire naturelle (1993). 196: 481–585
 Kilburn R.N., Marais J.P. & Marais A.P. (2010) Coralliophilinae. pp. 272–292, in: Marais A.P. & Seccombe A.D. (eds), Identification guide to the seashells of South Africa. Volume 1. Groenkloof: Centre for Molluscan Studies. 376 pp.

glaber
Gastropods described in 1998